ESI-PGIMSR & ESIC Medical College, Kolkata, also known by its full name Employees State Insurance Post Graduate Institute of Medical Sciences and Research & Employees State Insurance Corporation Medical College, Kolkata, is a MCI recognised medical college established in 2013 under the aegis of the ESI Corporation, a centrally controlled autonomous body.

This college received permission for 100 seats for this session from the Medical Council of India and is affiliated to the West Bengal University of Health Sciences.
Now it is permitted for 125 seats for MBBS from [Medical Council of India]
The college has admitted its students through the NEET AIQ (15%), State quota (35%) and IP quota (50%) since 2013.

Infrastructure

Lecture theaters
 College Building 4th floor: 150 capacity, gallery type
 College Building 5th floor: 250 capacity, gallery type
 College Building 6th floor: 120 capacity, gallery type
 College Building 7th floor: 120 capacity, gallery type
 Old Hospital Building 9th floor: 150 capacity, gallery type

Examination hall 
 College Building 2nd floor: 250 capacity

Students' hostel (MBBS) 
 Boys’ hostel 1 Block (G+15), with 32 rooms in each floor (within college campus)
 Girls’ hostel 1 Blocks (G+15), with 32 rooms in each floor (within college campus)
 First year boy's hostel (G+3)-2 buildings, with 16 capacity in each floor (within college campus)
 First year girl's hostel (G+3)-2 buildings, with 16 capacity on each floor (Within college campus)

Interns' hostel 
 Intern boys’: capacity 100 (within college campus)
 Intern girls’: capacity 50 (within college campus)

Sports and recreation facilities 
 Playground for badminton, volleyball, football
 Gymnasium facilities
 Auditorium
 Guest house within campus
 Canteen
 Indoor playground for Table Tennis and other sports

See also
Calcutta National Medical College
List of hospitals in India

References

External links
 Official website of ESI-PGIMSR & ESIC Medical College Joka, Kolkata
 https://www.esic.nic.in/medical-institution
 https://wbuhs.ac.in/

Medical colleges in West Bengal
Affiliates of West Bengal University of Health Sciences
Universities and colleges in Kolkata
Educational institutions established in 2013
Employees' State Insurance
2013 establishments in West Bengal